The South Florida Gold is a professional minor league basketball team in the American Basketball Association based in Lake Worth, Florida that began play in the 2013-14 ABA season.

The team was found in an audit by the School District of Palm Beach County to have posed as two different charities to get reduced rent for gym rental during the 2013-2014 and 2014–2015 seasons.

, the Gold has appeared on the league's rankings at #3, putting it behind the Jacksonville Giants and the Shreveport-Bossier Mavericks.

As of April 11, 2016, the Gold has appeared on the league's rankings at #2.

As of April 4, 2017, the Gold has appeared on the league's rankings at #1 for 3 consecutive weeks and maintained a top 4 spot during the season.

, the Gold has appeared on the league's rankings at #1 for 3 consecutive weeks. The South Florida Gold finished 3rd of 120 teams nationwide. The Gold also finished 2nd in the tournament held in Mexico at the launch of ABA Mexico.

As of March 4, 2019, the Gold has appeared at #1 for 1 week, for the final league rankings of the regular season.

References

External links
Official South Florida Gold website

American Basketball Association (2000–present) teams
Basketball teams in Florida
Boynton Beach, Florida
Basketball teams established in 2013
2013 establishments in Florida